Talkheh Zar (also Romanized as Talkheh Zār) is a village in Poshteh-ye Zilayi Rural District, Sarfaryab District, Charam County, Kohgiluyeh and Boyer-Ahmad Province, Iran. At the 2006 census, its population was 65, in 12 families.

References 

Populated places in Charam County